The 2015 Luton Borough Council election took place on 7 May 2015 to elect members of the Luton Borough Council in England. It was held on the same day as other local elections.

Ward Results

High Town

References

2015 English local elections
May 2015 events in the United Kingdom
2015
21st century in Bedfordshire